The 2000 Asian Women's Junior Handball Championship (6th tournament) took place in Dhaka from 25 July–31 July. It acts as the Asian qualifying tournament for the 2001 Women's Junior World Handball Championship.

Draw

Preliminary round

Group A

Group B

Placement 5th/6th

Final round

Semifinals

Bronze medal match

Gold medal match

Final standing

References
www.handball.jp (Archived 2009-09-04)

External links
www.asianhandball.com

International sports competitions hosted by Bangladesh
Asian Women's Junior Handball Championship, 2000
Asia
Asian Handball Championships
July 2000 sports events in Bangladesh